Nemanja Gordić (born September 25, 1988) is a Bosnian professional basketball player for U-BT Cluj-Napoca of the Romanian Liga Națională. He also represents the senior Bosnia and Herzegovina national basketball team internationally. Gordić also holds Serbian citizenship.

Professional career
Gordić made his professional debut with Budućnost Podgorica in the 2005–06 season. In December 2010, Gordić moved to Lottomatica Roma in Italy, where he would spend the next two seasons.

In November 2012, after only three months at Azovmash of Ukraine, Gordić signed with Partizan until the end of the 2013–14 season. In June 2013, he parted ways with Partizan. In October 2013, he signed a one-year deal with KK Igokea.

In June 2014, he signed a three-year deal with Cedevita Zagreb. After two seasons he left Cedevita and returned to his former club Budućnost.

In the 2017–18 season, Gordić won the ABA League title with Budućnost. After winning the series versus Crvena zvezda 1–3, Gordić was named ABA League Finals MVP.

On 5 July 2019, he returned to his former club Partizan. Gordić averaged 8.8 points and 4.6 assists per game. He re-signed with the team on 16 July 2020. Gordić left the team mid-season to join Mornar Bar, averaging 6.9 points and 4.5 assists per game. He re-signed with Mornar Bar on 14 August 2021.

On November 13, 2022, he signed with Cluj of the Romanian Liga Națională.

National team career
Gordić played for the senior national team of Bosnia and Herzegovina at the EuroBasket 2011, the EuroBasket 2013, and the EuroBasket 2015.

Personal life
He was born in 1988, in Mostar, SFR Yugoslavia in a Serb family. When he was four, he and his family took refuge to Gacko, his mother's birth town.

Career statistics

EuroLeague

|-
| style="text-align:left;"| 2010–11
| style="text-align:left;"| Lottomatica
| 6 || 1 || 22.6 || .413 || .467 || .667 || .3 || 2.5 || .2 || .0 || 9.7 || 4.5
|-
| style="text-align:left;"| 2012–13
| style="text-align:left;"| Partizan
| 5 || 1 || 11.2 || .350 || .143 || .000 || 2.0 || .6 || .4 || .0 || 3.0 || -1.0
|-
| style="text-align:left;"| 2014–15
| style="text-align:left;" rowspan=2| Cedevita
| 10 || 6 || 27.2 || .402 || .385 || .875 || 2.1 || 3.9 || 2.1 || .0 || 9.6 || 8.7
|-
| style="text-align:left;"| 2015–16
| 21 || 18 || 19.1 || .382 || .250 || .810 || 1.3 || 3.1 || .3 || .0 || 4.6 || 3.4
|-
| style="text-align:left;"| 2018–19
| style="text-align:left;"| Budućnost
| 30 || 18 || 23.3 || .387 || .304 || .714 || 1.7 || 3.6 || .6 || .0 || 7.6 || 6.3
|- class="sortbottom"
| style="text-align:center;" colspan=2| Career
| 72 || 26 || 21.7 || .379 || .330 || .750 || 1.5 || 3.2 || .7 || .0 || 6.8 || 5.1

Awards
Sportsperson of the year in Republika Srpska, 2014
 2× ABA League champion (2013, 2018)
 6× Montenegrin League champion (2007–2010, 2017, 2019)
 Serbian League champion (2013)
 2× Croatian League champion (2015, 2016)
 Serbian Cup winner (2020)
 7× Montenegrin Cup winner (2007–2010, 2017–2019)
 2× Croatian Cup winner (2015, 2016)
 ABA League Finals MVP (2018)
 All-ABA League Team (2018)
ABA League Supercup (2019)

References

External links
Nemanja Gordić at aba-liga.com
Nemanja Gordić at euroleague.net
Nemanja Gordić at fiba.com
Nemanja Gordić at fiba.com (game-center)

1988 births
Living people
ABA League players
Basketball League of Serbia players
Basketball players from Mostar
BC Azovmash players
Bosnia and Herzegovina expatriate basketball people in Serbia
Bosnia and Herzegovina men's basketball players
KK Budućnost players
KK Cedevita players
KK Igokea players
KK Partizan players
KK Mornar Bar players
Pallacanestro Virtus Roma players
Point guards
Serbs of Bosnia and Herzegovina